Charles Steele may refer to:
 Charles Steele (RAF officer) (1897–1973), World War I British flying ace
 Charles Steele (lawyer) (1858–1939), American lawyer with J.P. Morgan & Co. 
 Charles Kenzie Steele (1914–1980), American preacher and civil rights activist
 Charles R. Steele (1933–2021), American mechanical engineer
 Charles Steele Jr. (born 1946), American businessman, politician, and civil rights leader
 Charlie Steele Jr. (1930–2008), New Zealand football player
 Charlie Steele Sr., New Zealand football player

See also
 Charles Steel (1901–1993), British Army officer and civil servant
 Steele (surname)